Coltsfoot is the common name for several plants in the family Asteraceae:

 Homogyne alpina, a plant species native to Europe
 Petasites, a plant genus native to Europe, Asia, and North America
 Tussilago farfara, a plant species native to Europe and parts of Asia and Africa

See also
 Butterbur (disambiguation)
 Coltsfoot Green, a small hamlet in Suffolk, England
 Coltsfoot Rock, a confectionery product